CityArts may refer to:
CITYarts, Inc. (1989–present) nonprofit public arts and education organization
Cityarts Workshop (1971–1988), nonprofit community mural arts organization
Manhattan Media American media company